Koregaon may refer to any of the following places in Maharashtra, India:

 Koregaon, a town in Satara district
 Koregaon Taluka
 Koregaon (Vidhan Sabha constituency)
 Koregaon Bhima, a village in Pune district, located on the banks of Bhima river
 Battle of Koregaon, fought in 1818 at Koregaon Bhima
 Koregaon Park, a locality in Pune
 Koregaon Park Plaza, a shopping mall in Pune